Michael David Apted,  (10 February 1941 – 7 January 2021) was a British television and film director and producer.

Apted began working in television and directed the Up documentary series (1964–2019). He later directed Coal Miner's Daughter (1980), which was nominated for seven Academy Awards including Best Picture. His subsequent work included Gorillas in the Mist (1988), Nell (1994), James Bond film The World Is Not Enough (1999), and Enigma (2001). His film Amazing Grace (2006) premiered at the closing of the Toronto International Film Festival that year.

On 29 June 2003, he was elected president of the Directors Guild of America, a position he served until 2009. He was appointed Companion of the Order of St Michael and St George (CMG) in the 2008 Birthday Honours.

Early life
Apted was born in 1941 in Aylesbury, Buckinghamshire, as the son of Frances Amelia (née Thomas) and Ronald William Apted. He was educated at City of London School and Downing College, Cambridge, where he studied law and history.

Career

Television
He began his career in television as a trainee for six months at Granada Television in Manchester, where he worked as a researcher. One of his first projects at Granada would become his best known: the Up series, which began in 1964 as a profile of 14 seven-year-old children for the current affairs series World in Action. As a researcher and assistant to Canadian director Paul Almond, Apted was involved in selecting the children, who came from a variety of backgrounds and classes. Though originally conceived as a one-off documentary, the series has become an institution. When it was suggested that they revisit the subjects at ages fourteen and twenty one, Apted accepted the offer to direct and directed every subsequent episode in the series. It explores Apted's thesis that the British class system remains largely in place. It studies the participants based on the Jesuit motto "Give me a child until he is seven and I will show you the man", looking at how they develop during their lives, compared to when they were seven. The series looks at the lives of these people over the years; the latest instalment, 63 Up, was produced in 2019. It won a Peabody Award in 2012 "for its creator’s patience and its subjects' humanity."

During his seven-year period of working at Granada, Apted also directed a number of episodes of Coronation Street, then written by Jack Rosenthal, among others. Apted and Rosenthal later collaborated on a number of popular television and film projects, including the pilot episodes for The Dustbinmen and The Lovers. They worked together again in 1982 for the TV movie P'tang, Yang, Kipperbang, the first film commissioned by Britain's Channel 4. In 1976 Apted directed a play in the Granada TV series Laurence Olivier Presents. The episode was The Collection by Harold Pinter. The play starred Laurence Olivier, Malcolm McDowell, Alan Bates and Helen Mirren.

Apted used his idea from the Up series a second time in Married in America and Married in America 2. The idea was to interview nine married couples every two years over a ten-year period to tell a more complete story of their marriages. In 2005, he directed the first three episodes of the TV series Rome.

For his work in television, Apted won several British Academy Awards, including two Flaherty Documentary Awards for his work on 28 Up and 35 Up and a BAFTA for Best Dramatic Director for the single play Kisses at Fifty in 1974.

Coronation Street (1967), 24 episodes
Haunted (1967)
The Shooting War (1967)
There's a Hole in Your Dustbin, Delilah (1968) – written by Jack Rosenthal
Your Name’s Not God, It’s Edgar (1968) written by Jack Rosenthal
The Dustbinmen (1969)
Big Breadwinner Hog (1969)
Parkin's Patch (1969–70), 8 episodes
The Lovers (1970)
Another Sunday and Sweet F.A. (1972) – written by Jack Rosenthal
Follyfoot (1971, 1972), "Moonstone" and "Poor Bald Head" episodes
Shades of Greene (1975), "The Destructors" episode
The Collection (1976) – written by Harold Pinter and starring Laurence Olivier
Play for Today (1972–77), 6 episodes
P'tang, Yang, Kipperbang (1982)
My Life and Times (1991), 2 episodes
Crossroads (1992), co-director
New York News (1995), 1 episode
Always Outnumbered (1998) – written by Walter Mosley and starring Laurence Fishburne
Married in America (2002–06)
Rome (2005), 3 episodes
What About Brian (2006), 1 episode
Hallelujah (2011)
Masters of Sex (2013–16), 2 episodes
Ray Donovan (2013–16), 2 episodes
Reckless (2014), episode 5: "Bloodstone"
Bloodline (2017), "Part 30" episode

Film
Apted made his first feature film in 1972, The Triple Echo, starring Oliver Reed and Glenda Jackson, and he directed two films for David Puttnam. The Triple Echo was entered into the 8th Moscow International Film Festival. He alternated this work with working on the TV series Play for Today. He directed six plays including Stronger than the Sun, written by Stephen Poliakoff and starring Francesca Annis as a young woman who places her life in danger to expose a crime, a theme Apted returned to several times.

In 1979 he directed the Hollywood-financed Agatha, featuring Vanessa Redgrave. The majority of Apted's feature films since then were based around a female protagonist. He went to the United States in 1980, where he directed Coal Miner's Daughter, which received seven Academy Award nominations, winning best actress for Sissy Spacek. Both Spacek and Loretta Lynn, the subject of the film, have said that they believe Apted's outsider point of view was crucial to the movie's success in securing the participation of Appalachian residents and to the avoidance of stereotypes that previously had marred portrayals of mountain culture. In 2019, Coal Miner's Daughter was selected by the Library of Congress for preservation in the National Film Registry for being "culturally, historically, or aesthetically significant".

Apted also made several films with a strong social message or that deal with an ethical dilemma. In 1983 he directed Gorky Park, a political thriller based on the novel by Martin Cruz Smith, that deals with police corruption in the former Soviet Union. Class Action deals with a corporate whistleblower, and Extreme Measures is about medical ethics. Class Action was entered into the 17th Moscow International Film Festival.

In 1994, he directed Nell, which received three Golden Globe Award nominations and one Academy Award nomination.

In 1999, Apted directed the James Bond film The World Is Not Enough.

The Triple Echo (1972)
Stardust (1974)
Trick or Treat (1975) (unfinished)
The Squeeze (1977)
Agatha (1979)
Coal Miner's Daughter (1980)
Continental Divide (1981)
Gorky Park (1983)
Firstborn (1984)
Bring On the Night (1985)
Critical Condition(1987)
Gorillas in the Mist (1988)
Class Action (1991)
Thunderheart (1992)
Incident at Oglala (1992)
Blink (1993)
Moving the Mountain (1994)
Nell (1994)
Extreme Measures (1996)
The World Is Not Enough (1999)
Me & Isaac Newton (1999)
Enigma (2001)
Enough (2002)
Amazing Grace (2006)
The Chronicles of Narnia: The Voyage of the Dawn Treader (2010)
Chasing Mavericks (2012)
Unlocked (2017)

Documentary
In addition to the Up series, Apted made other documentaries, including Bring On the Night, a feature-length concert film about the making of Sting's first solo album. He directed the documentary The Long Way Home, which was released in 1989. It chronicled the UK, US and USSR adventures of Boris Grebenshchikov, the first Soviet underground musician allowed to record in the West.

Before the making of Thunderheart, Apted made the documentary Incident at Oglala about Leonard Peltier. Incident at Oglala then informed Thunderheart in the casting of actors for the fiction film.

In 1997, he explored the creative process in Inspirations through candid discussion with seven artists from diverse media, including David Bowie, Louise Lecavalier and Roy Lichtenstein among others.

In a departure from his earlier work, from 1992 to 1994, Apted ventured into China's rapidly changing popular culture. In a project backed by Trudie Styler, Apted directed Moving the Mountain, a feature documentary which probed the origins of the 1989 protests in Tiananmen Square and the consequences of the movement in the lives of several of the movement's student leaders.

In 2006, Apted co-directed The Official Film of the 2006 FIFA World Cup, narrated by Pierce Brosnan.

Apted was the collaborator and subject of the documentary: Michael Apted – Visions on Film, by artist and filmmaker Melinda Camber Porter.

Theatre

In 1977, Apted directed the premiere of Strawberry Fields at the National Theatre in London.

Personal life

Apted married Paige Simpson, his third wife, in January 2014. Apted was divorced from his second wife of ten years, the screenwriter Dana Stevens, with whom he had a son, John. From his first marriage to Jo, he had two sons, Paul and Jim. Paul Apted was a sound editor who worked on movies such as The Wolverine; he died from colon cancer in 2014. In 2007 Apted became a father for the fourth time to a girl, Lily Mellis Apted, who lives with her mother Tania Mellis.

He served as president of the Directors Guild of America from 2003 to 2009 and served as the secretary-treasurer from 2011 to his death.

Apted died at his home in Los Angeles on 7 January 2021, at the age of 79.

References

External links

 
 Michael Apted biography at BFI Screenonline
 Resumé at Peters, Fraser & Dunlop
 Interview with Michael Apted on "Amazing Grace" by ReadTheSpirit.com
 

1941 births
2021 deaths
Alumni of Downing College, Cambridge
BAFTA winners (people)
British documentary film directors
Companions of the Order of St Michael and St George
Directors Guild of America Award winners
English expatriates in the United States
English film directors
English television directors
English television producers
Fellows of Downing College, Cambridge
Grammy Award winners
People educated at the City of London School
People from Aylesbury
Presidents of the Directors Guild of America